Johns may refer to:

Places
 Johns, Mississippi, an unincorporated community
 Johns, Oklahoma, United States, a community
 Johns Creek (Chattahoochee River), Georgia, United States
 Johns Island (disambiguation), islands in Canada and the United States
 Johns Mountain, a summit in Georgia
 Johns River (disambiguation)
 Johns River (Vermont), a tributary of Lake Memphremagog
 Johns Township, Appanoose County, Iowa, United States

Other uses
 Johns (surname)
 Johns Hopkins (1795–1873), American entrepreneur, investor and philanthropist
 johns (film), a 1996 film starring David Arquette and Lukas Haas

See also 
 John (disambiguation)
 Justice Johns (disambiguation)